Zheng Yi Sao (1775–1844; born Shi Yang, a.k.a. Shi Xianggu), also known as Ching Shih, was a Chinese pirate leader who was active in the South China Sea from 1801 to 1810.

Born as Shi Yang in 1775 to humble origins, she married a pirate named Zheng Yi at age 26 in 1801. She was named Zheng Yi Sao ("wife of Zheng Yi") by the people of Guangdong. After the death of her husband in 1807, she took control of his pirate confederation with the support of his adopted son Zhang Bao, with whom she entered into a relationship and later married. As the unofficial commander of the Guangdong Pirate Confederation, her fleet was composed of 400 junks and between 40,000 to 60,000 pirates in 1805. Her ships entered into conflict with several major powers, such as the East India Company, the Portuguese Empire, and Qing China. 

In 1810, Zheng Yi Sao negotiated a surrender to the Qing authorities which allowed her and Zhang Bao to retain a substantial fleet and avoid prosecution. At the time of her surrender, she personally commanded 24 ships and over 1,400 pirates. She died in 1844 at the age of about 68, having lived a relatively peaceful and prosperous life since the end of her career in piracy. Zheng Yi Sao has been described as history's most successful female pirate, and one of the most successful pirates in history.

Early life 
Zheng Yi Sao was born in 1775 in around Xinhui, Guangdong. She was possibly a Tanka, who worked as a prostitute or procurer on a floating Tanka brothel in Guangdong.

Marriage to Zheng Yi
In 1801, Shi Yang married Zheng Yi, a well-known pirate.

Zheng Yi was a pirate who fought as a privateer for the Vietnamese Tây Sơn dynasty in the Tây Sơn wars against Qing China and later Nguyễn Ánh. Under Tây Sơn patronage, he fought in his cousin Zheng Qi's fleet. Zheng Yi hailed from a family of well-known pirates whose roots traced back to the Ming dynasty. He had an adopted son, Zhang Bao, who had been abducted by Zheng Yi in 1798 at the age of 15, and subsequently pressed into piracy.

A year after their marriage in February 1802, Zheng Yi's cousin Zheng Qi was captured and executed by Nguyễn forces in the town of Jiangping on the border of Vietnam and China, near what is now Dongxing. On July 20, 1802, Nguyễn Ánh entered the city of Thăng Long, ending the Tây Sơn dynasty. Zheng Yi quickly took over Zheng Qi's fleet after his death, and sailed back to the Chinese coast together with the rest of the Chinese pirates formerly under Tây Sơn patronage. A period of infighting among the pirates near the Guangdong coast followed; but with the help of Zheng Yi Sao, who was a capable consolidator and organizer, Zheng Yi was able to unite the pirates into a confederation through the signing of an agreement on July 1805 in which each pirate leader agreed to sacrifice some of his autonomy for the greater good. The confederation consisted of six fleets known by the colour of their flags – red, black, blue, white, yellow, and purple. Zheng Yi commanded the biggest fleet in the confederation, the Red Flag Fleet.

Zheng Yi Sao had two sons with Zheng Yi: Zheng Yingshi, who was born in 1803, and Zheng Xiongshi, who was born in 1807.

Ascension to leadership
On 16 November 1807, Zheng Yi fell overboard in a gale and died at the age of 42. Zheng Yi Sao quickly took over her deceased husband's operations, through the support of Zheng Yi's nephew Zheng Baoyang and the son of Zheng Qi, Zheng Anbang. Zheng Yi Sao also balanced the various factions in the confederation, and was familiar with Guo Podai, leader of the second biggest fleet in the confederation, the Black Flag Fleet, who had been abducted by Zheng Yi and pressed into piracy at a young age. Most importantly, Zheng Yi Sao had the support of Zhang Bao, who was in effect commanding the Red Flag Fleet at the time.

Zheng Yi Sao effectively inherited her deceased husband's informal command over the entire Pirate Confederation, while Zhang Bao became the official commander of the Red Flag Fleet. According to a report by Wen Cheng Zhi, a government official who led the negotiations with Zheng Yi Sao and Zhang Bao with the Viceroy of Liangguang Bai Ling later in 1810, "Zhang Bao obeyed Zheng Yi Sao's orders, and consulted her on all things before acting."

After taking control of the confederation, Zheng Yi Sao and Zhang Bao quickly entered a sexual relationship. It is speculated that they were already intimate before the death of Zheng Yi.

Leader of the confederation 
In 1808, a year after Zheng Yi Sao took power, the Pirate Confederation became significantly more active. In September, Zhang Bao first lured then ambushed Lin Guoliang, brigade-general of Humen, and destroyed his fleet of 35 ships near Mazhou Island, located east of what is now Bao'an District, Shenzhen. A month later in October, Zhang Bao defeated lieutenant-colonel Lin Fa near present-day Weiyuan Island east of Humen Town. These two engagements reduced the Chinese provincial fleet by half, and cleared the way for the pirates to enter the Pearl River.

1809 was an eventful year for the Pirate Confederation under the command of Zheng Yi Sao. In March, Provincial Commander Sun Quanmou, with around 100 ships under his command, engaged a small group of pirates near Dawanshan Island, and the pirates called Zheng Yi Sao for aid. Before the battle, Zheng Yi Sao took command of the Red Flag Fleet and the White Flag Fleet and ordered Zhang Bao to engage from the front with around 10 ships. Zhang Bao's lieutenants, Xiang Shan'er and Xiao Bu'ao were to outflank Sun from the sides, and Liang Bao, leader of the White Flag Fleet, was to cut Sun off from the rear. During the battle Zheng Yi Sao charged in with the bulk of the Red and the White Flag Fleets, which routed Sun.

On July 21, the Qing navy dealt a major blow to the Pirate Confederation by killing Liang Bao and destroying his White Flag Fleet at an engagement near what is now Jinwan District, Zhuhai, at the cost of losing brigade-general Xu Tinggui and 25 ships to Zhang Bao.

Liang's death and the destruction of the White Flag Fleet did not deter Zheng Yi Sao. In August 1809 she ordered a massive raid: Zhang Bao would raid around Dongguan with the Red Flag Fleet, Guo Podai would raid around Shunde with the Black Flag Fleet, and Zheng Yi Sao would lead the raid around Xinhui with her personal fleet. Guo Podai worked his way through the numerous waterways along the Pearl River for six weeks on a bloody raiding campaign which ultimately caused the deaths of approximately 10,000 people. In early September, Zhang Bao completely destroyed a large town not far from Humen and killed 2,000 inhabitants. Numerous villages, settlements, and towns fell victim to the rampaging pirates.

On September 27, Zheng Yi Sao personally took command of 500 ships and anchored near Tanzhou. On the 29th, Zheng Yi Sao ordered Zhang Bao to raid the town of Shating further upriver, where he captured around 400 civilians; on October 2, Zheng Yi Sao ordered Guo Podai to anchor around Jigongshi, presumably near Sanxiongqi (modern day Sanhongqi ), where he raided two days later.

By late October, the provincial fleet was back to strength and ready for action under the command of Sun Quanmou, but was defeated again by Zhang Bao on the evening of October 21 near the town of Shawan.

Blockade of Tung Chung Bay 

In desperation, Chinese officials looked with renewed interest at the "foreign barbarians", hoping to obtain aid against Zheng Yi Sao and the Pirate Confederation. The Portuguese Empire, which controlled Macau at the time, agreed to help – on September 5, 1809, Zheng Yi Sao had captured the brig of Antonio Botelho Homen (the Portuguese governor of Timor), and the Portuguese were eager for payback.

In early November, 1809, Zheng Yi Sao suddenly left the Pearl River with only a few ships, and anchored at Tung Chung Bay, north of Lantau Island, for repairs. On November 4, the Portuguese sent three ships and a brig to harass Zheng Yi Sao at Lantau; she immediately called the Red Flag Fleet under Zhang Bao for aid. On the 5th, Zhang Bao arrived at Tung Chung Bay and, seeing that the Portuguese were no longer there, decided to anchor his ships for repair and maintenance. However, on the 8th, six Portuguese ships, the Inconquistável (frigate), the Indiana (brig), the Belisário (brig), the Conceição (brig), the São Miguel (brig), and the Princesa Carlota (brig), under the command of artillery captain José Pinto Alcoforado de Azevedo e Sousa, blockaded Zheng Yi Sao and Zhang Bao within Tung Chung Bay. On the 20th, 93 ships from the provincial fleet joined the Portuguese in their blockade, commanded by Sun Quanmou.

The pirates made various attempts to counterattack and break the blockade, but were unsuccessful due to unfavorable winds. On the 23rd, the pirates managed to capture one ship from the provincial fleet, and killed the 74 men aboard. The situation turned into a stalemate between the pirates and the joint Sino-Portuguese fleet. Frustrated with the lack of progress, Sun Quanmou converted 43 of his ships into fireships and set them adrift towards the pirates in Tung Chung Bay on the 28th. The pirates diverted the fireships, towed them ashore, extinguished the fires, and broke them up for firewood. At this point the wind changed, and two of the fireships were blown back to the provincial fleet and ignited two of Sun's own ships. On the 29th, Zhang Bao and Zheng Yi Sao, taking full advantage of the wind, broke through the blockade, and escaped into the South China Sea. The provincial fleet lost 3 ships and at least 74 men, while the pirates lost 40 men and no ships.

Surrendering to the Qing authorities 
1810 saw the end of the Pirate Confederation. Sources differ on the motivation as to why the pirates surrendered. 

By early 1810, the pirates began to realize that they were in such a position of power that they could negotiate to surrender to the Guangdong government without punishment or reparations being imposed on them. Guangdong was so desperate to end the scourge of piracy that they were ready to legitimize their power in exchange for their retirement. 

An alternative viewpoint is that by the end of 1809 the tides were turning against Zheng Yi Sao and the Pirate Confederation. Guo Podai, leader of the Black Flag Fleet, refused to reinforce Zheng Yi Sao and Zhang Bao during the Battle of Tung Chung Bay, and later openly battled with Zhang Bao near Humen. On January 13, 1810, Guo Podai officially surrendered to the Viceroy of Liangguang, Bai Ling, and was rewarded with the rank of sublieutenant.

The Portuguese and the British also officially joined in the fray. On September 15, 1809, the British ship Mercury agreed to join 60 provincial warships in patrolling the inner passage of the Pearl River. On November 23, the Portuguese officially signed an agreement with Bai Ling that called for six Portuguese ships to join the Chinese provincial fleet on patrol between Humen and Macau for six months.

Bai Ling's policy of militia training and embargoes also enjoyed reasonable success in cutting off the pirates' supply lines. But it was all these reasons combined, plus the organizational limit of the Pirate Confederation, which was held together by a few charismatic leaders such as Zheng Yi Sao, Zhang Bao, and Guo Podai, that led Zheng Yi Sao to consider surrendering to the authorities in early 1810.

With Macau's Ouvidor (magistrate) Miguel José de Arriaga as mediator, Zheng Yi Sao, Zhang Bao, and Bai Ling officially met on Zhang Bao's flagship on February 21, 1810. The negotiations quickly broke down when Bai Ling refused Zheng Yi Sao and Zhang Bao's demand of retaining 5,000 subordinates and 80 ships for entering the salt trade and joining the anti-pirate campaign in western Guangdong. At the end of the day, ten British Indiamen sailed past the pirate fleet and alarmed Zhang Bao, who suspected some sort of Sino-European trap and quickly retreated.

On April 17, Zheng Yi Sao, wanting to break the deadlock, personally led a delegation of 17 women and children to the Yamen at Guangzhou and negotiated with Bai Ling, where he yielded to her demands. On April 20, 1810, Zheng Yi Sao and Zhang Bao officially surrendered to Bai Ling near Furongsha (near what is now Guzaiwan ) with 17,318 pirates, 226 ships, 1,315 cannons, and 2,798 assorted weapons. Zheng Yi Sao surrendered with 24 ships and 1,433 pirates under her personal command. Zhang Bao was awarded the rank of lieutenant, and was allowed to retain a private fleet of 20 to 30 ships. Zheng Yi Sao was also given permission to officially marry Zhang Bao. Zheng Yi Sao and her crews were pardoned, and the men received pork, wine and money.

Life after piracy and death
After surrendering, Zhang Bao further distinguished himself by defeating the Blue Flag Fleet under Wu Shi'er near the Leizhou Peninsula. Zhang Bao, with Zheng Yi Sao accompanying him, was later transferred to Min'an, Fujian, where Zheng Yi Sao gave birth to a son, Zhang Yulin, in 1813.

In 1822, Zhang Bao, aged 36, died near Penghu while serving as a colonel in charge of the Penghu garrison. In 1824, Zheng Yi Sao returned to Guangdong with Zhang Yulin. In 1840, while living at Nanhai, Zheng Yi Sao filed charges against a government official, Wu Yaonan, for having embezzled 28,000 taels of silver that Zhang Bao had handed over to him in 1810 for the purchase of an estate. The Viceroy of Liangguang at the time, Lin Zexu, petitioned the emperor to dismiss the case, which he did.

In 1844, Zheng Yi Sao died at the age of 68 or 69, having led a relatively peaceful life after the death of her second husband, as the proprietor of an infamous gambling house somewhere around Guangdong.

Legacy 
Zhang Bao's three codes for the pirates of the Red Flag Fleet are often misattributed to Zheng Yi Sao. The codes are:

If any pirate goes privately on shore, he shall be taken, his ears mutilated, he will be paraded around the fleet and executed.
Not the least thing shall be taken privately from the stolen and plundered goods, all shall be registered. The pirate receives for himself, out of ten parts, only two; eight parts belong to the storehouse, called the general fund; those who steal anything out of this general fund, shall be executed.
Women captured from villages shall not be harmed or harassed. All women captives shall be registered, their place of origin recorded, and be given separate quarters. Those who rape or commit adultery with the women captives shall be executed.

The three codes and the fact that Zhang Bao was the author of the codes were recorded in Jing hai fen ji, an account of the Pirate Confederation by Qing official Yuan Yonglun based on first-hand testimonies. The misattribution of the codes to Zheng Yi Sao most likely originated from Philip Gosse's The History of Piracy, first published in 1932, in which he said Zheng Yi Sao had drawn up "a code of rules for her crews which somewhat resembled those subscribed to by earlier European pirates." Gosse claimed to have based the story of Zheng Yi Sao on a translation of Jing hai fen ji by Charles F. Neumann in History of the Pirates Who Infested the China Sea from 1807 to 1810 published in 1831, which in itself contains numerous translation errors. It is thought that Gosse was primarily interested in a sensationalized account of Zheng Yi Sao, as he claimed in The History of Piracy that "the original (Jing hai fen ji), published in Canton in 1830, is chiefly devoted to the exploits of one pirate, and that a woman," while in fact Jin hai fen ji contains significantly more mentions of Zhang Bao (88) than Zheng Yi Sao (25).

Although the fact that the codes were misattributed was established, other sources list additional codes that may have been issued by Zheng Yi Sao, which is compiled below:
 Anyone caught giving commands on their own or disobeying a command from a superior is to be immediately decapitated.
 Pilfering from common treasury or public fund, and stealing from villagers who supplied the pirates were capital offences.
 No pirate could retain any good before inspection.
 Goods had to be registered and then distributed by the fleet leader.
 20% of the booty was to be returned to the original captor and the remainder was placed in a joint treasury or storehouse.
 Currency was to be handed over to the squadron leader, part was turned over to the fleet, and some back to the captor.

A semi-fictionalized account of Zheng Yi Sao, based on Philip Gosse's The History of Piracy, appeared in Jorge Luis Borges' short story The Widow Ching, Lady Pirate (part of A Universal History of Infamy (1935)), where she is described as "a lady pirate who operated in Asian waters, all the way from the Yellow Sea to the rivers of the Annam coast", and who, after surrendering to the imperial forces, is pardoned and allowed to live the rest of her life as an opium smuggler. In the story, Borges repeated the incorrect claim that the pirate codes were issued by Zheng Yi Sao.

In 2020 Angela Eiter finished the first ascent of the mountain climbing route Madame Ching (which she named after Zheng Yi Sao) in Imst, Austria.

Arts, entertainment, and media

Film 

 Singing Behind Screens (2003), directed by Ermanno Olmi, is loosely based on Jorge Luis Borges' short story The Widow Ching, Lady Pirate.
 Pirates of the Caribbean: At World's End (2007), directed by Gore Verbinski, featured a character played by Takayo Fischer named Mistress Ching that is loosely based on Zheng Yi Sao.

Virtual reality experience 
 Madame Pirate: Becoming a Legend (2021), directed by Dan Chi Huang and Morgan Ommer, is a fictional re-telling of Zheng Yi Sao's rise to power.  With Yi Ti Yao, Shang-Ho Huang, Ling Yuan Kung, Hao-Hsiang Hsu. Produced by Serendipity Films.

Literature 

 The short story The Widow Ching, Lady Pirate in A Universal History of Infamy (1935) by Jorge Luis Borges is loosely based on Zheng Yi Sao's life.
 In The Wake of the Lorelei Lee (2012), book 8 of L.A. Meyer's Bloody Jack series, the character Cheng Shih is based on Zheng Yi Sao.
 The Flower Boat Girl (2021) by Larry Feign is a fictional novel based closely on the life of Zheng Yi Sao, incorporating historical research done by the author.
 The science fiction novel Mickey7 (2022), by Edward Ashton, refers to the first interstellar human colonial mission as having departed on a ship named the Ching Shih. A film adaptation of the novel, directed by Bong Joon-Ho, has been reported to be Bong's next project.
 The science fiction novel The Red Scholar's Wake (2022), by Aliette de Bodard, features space pirates modelled on Ching Shih and the pirates od the South China Sea.

Manga and graphic novels 

 In chapter 15 of Codename: Sailor V (November 1997), a manga created by Naoko Takeuchi, Sailor V transforms temporarily into Zheng Yi Sao.
 Afterlife (2006) is a OEL graphic novel that depicts Zheng Yi Sao as a guardian who fights demons to protect the denizens of the underworld.
 In chapter 60 of Worn and Torn Newbie, a Korean webtoon, a female pirate captain appears as Ching Shih.

Television 

 In Captain of Destiny (2015), a Hong Kong television drama, Maggie Shiu plays Shek Kiu, who is based on Zheng Yi Sao.
 Zheng Yi Sao is portrayed by Crystal Yu in the 2022 Doctor Who special "Legend of the Sea Devils".

Podcasts

 An episode of BBC Sounds podcast You're Dead To Me focuses on Zheng Yi Sao. Host Greg Jenner is joined by Ria Lina and Prof. Ronald C. Po.

Video Games 

 The Pirate hero from For Honor is heavily inspired by Ching Shih.
 Baozhai, a character from Indivisible, is inspired by Ching Shih.

Music 

  The song "Bloody Rose of China" by The Jolly Rogers tells a version of the story of her life.

Musicals 

 The musical Asian Pirate Musical features a version of her.

See also
Pirates of the South China Coast
Cheung Po Tsai

References

Footnotes

Sources 

 

 

 
 
 

1775 births
1844 deaths
18th-century Chinese women
18th-century Chinese people
19th-century Chinese women
19th-century Chinese people
19th-century pirates
Chinese brothel owners and madams
Chinese female prostitutes
Chinese pirates
Chinese female pirates
People from Guangzhou
Qing dynasty people
Date of birth unknown
Date of death unknown
Women in war in China
Women in 18th-century warfare
Women in 19th-century warfare